Mass media in the Netherlands – television, radio, newspapers, magazines – are characterised by a tradition of politico-denominational segregation ("pillarisation") on the one hand and an increasing degree of commercialism on the other.

Television and radio

Television and radio are provided by a system of public-broadcasting organisations (sharing three television and five radio networks) together with a number of commercial channels.

Public service broadcasting

The Netherlands Public Broadcasting system arose from the former practice – known as "pillarisation" – in which the country's various religious and social groups all organised their own institutions, with financial help from the government. These institutions included broadcasting. Although the system of pillarisation largely collapsed in the 1970s, the broadcasting associations themselves have remained active. Most have several tens of thousands of members, and they are allocated broadcasting time on the public channels in proportion to the size of their memberships. In addition, a number of other broadcasting foundations, established by the government, also receive air time.

The system is financed from three sources: 
grant-in-aid payments from the government, raised from general taxation;
the income from on-air advertising, regulated by the Stichting Ether Reclame (STER), a public body; 
(a small proportion of the total) the dues paid by members of the broadcasting associations.

The broadcasting associations share three national television channels (NPO 1, NPO 2, NPO 3) and seven radio channels (NPO Radio 1, NPO Radio 2, NPO 3FM, NPO Radio 4, NPO Radio 5, NPO Radio 6, and FunX). Each of these television channels have their own profile: thus NPO 1 is oriented towards news, sport, and family programming, NPO 2 towards culture, arts, politics, and religion, while NPO 3 concentrates on youth and progressive programming.

There are also several provincial television channels, which are organised by the provinces.
<div class="plainlinks">

Commercial broadcasting
Commercial broadcasting was banned until the late 1980s. In the 1970s, before they were allowed to join the public television system, Veronica and TROS had broadcast as off-shore pirate stations. In the 1980s the RTL Group started broadcasting from Luxembourg. In 1988 commercial broadcasting was legalised. Currently there are seven larger channels owned by two companies. RTL owns RTL 4, RTL 5, RTL 7, RTL 8 and RTL Z, while SBS, the Finnish publisher Sanoma and Dutch television production company Talpa (formally SBS Broadcasting Group) own SBS 6, SBS 9, NET 5 and Veronica. There are also other networks present, offering speciality channels. Among them are Discovery Benelux, Viacom Media, Fox Channels, Disney-ABC and Time Warner.

Newspapers

All newspapers are privately owned. They were historically linked to the pillarisation system, with some titles having strong links to labour unions or political parties. These ties have all been severed now. Two companies play a large role: Medialaan - De Persgroep Publishing, which owns several newspapers; and Telegraaf Media Groep, which owns De Telegraaf (the largest paper) and Sp!ts, a free newspaper.

The most important papers are the populist right-wing tabloid De Telegraaf, the progressive liberal NRC Handelsblad, which also publishes nrc•next, the Protestant Trouw and the progressive left-wing De Volkskrant. The latter two newspaper won in consecutive years (2012, 2013) the prestigious award for being the best nationwide newspaper in Europe at the European Newspaper Award.

Smaller Protestant communities have their own paper, like the Nederlands Dagblad and the Reformatorisch Dagblad. The business community has the Het Financieele Dagblad. A recent phenomenon are the widely read free newspapers Spits and the Metro. There are also several local and regional newspapers. The Algemeen Dagblad, the third largest paper, recently merged with several local papers to form a hybrid national-local paper.

Websites 
Most broadcasting and newspapers organizations have online presence. Some organizations publish exclusively online, such as NU.nl, Tweakers, Dumpert and GeenStijl.

Magazines

Magazines were, like the other media, frequently connected to pillars, such as Beatrijs, a Catholic woman's weekly. The main news magazines are the left-wing Vrij Nederland and De Groene Amsterdammer and the more right-wing Elsevier and HP/De Tijd.

Some 1970 Dutch magazines formerly owned by Verenigde Nederlandse Uitgeverijen were sold to by the Finnish media group Sanoma. Apart from many typical Dutch ones like Margriet, Libelle and Nieuwe Revu, these include Donald Duck (a comic book with Disney comics) and the Dutch edition of Playboy.

Books

See also
 Open access in the Netherlands

References

Bibliography

External links
 
 

 
Netherlands
Netherlands